Chase Michael Jeter (born September 19, 1997) is an American basketball player. He played college basketball for the Duke Blue Devils and the Arizona Wildcats.

High school career
Jeter played basketball for Bishop Gorman High School in Summerlin, Nevada. He played for the junior varsity team as a freshman and played in the adidas 64 Tournament with his Dream Vision team. He was promoted to the varsity team as a sophomore. By the time he was a junior, Jeter had become one of the most touted power forwards in high school basketball, receiving much collegiate attention. Five-star recruit Stephen Zimmerman was a teammate of Jeter's at Bishop Gorman. As a junior, he averaged 14.7 points and 10.6 rebounds per game, leading Gorman to a 30–3 record and Division I state title. In his senior season, Jeter averaged 16.2 points and 10.6 rebounds per game and won another Division I state championship. He was named Nevada Gatorade Player of the Year. At the end of the season, Jeter played in the McDonald's All-American Game and Nike Hoop Summit. He was a consensus five-star recruit and was ranked No. 11 overall in the 2015 class by ESPN. On August 4, 2014, Jeter committed to Duke over Arizona, Kansas, Oregon, UCLA and UNLV, citing the environment of the team's arena, Cameron Indoor Stadium.

College career
Jeter received limited playing time in his freshman season, averaging 1.9 points and 1.9 rebounds per game over 32 appearances. In his sophomore debut, he made his first career start, recording a season-high 11 points and eight rebounds in a 94–49 win over Marist. In January 2017, he missed a game against NC State as he underwent surgery to treat a herniated disk and was subsequently limited for the final two months of the season. As a sophomore, Jeter averaged 2.6 points, 2.7 rebounds and 1.1 blocks in 14.9 minutes per game. After the season, he announced that he would transfer from Duke and sit out the following season. Coach Mike Krzyzewski praised his academic record and stated he wished Jeter the best.

On May 16, 2017, Jeter committed to continue his career at Arizona. In his debut for the Wildcats on November 7, 2018, he registered his first double-double with 11 points and 10 rebounds in a 90–60 victory over Houston Baptist. On January 12, 2019, Jeter posted a career-high 23 points and nine rebounds in an 87–65 win over California. Later that month, he missed two games with a sore back. When he returned against Arizona State, Jeter experienced lingering stiffness and went 1-of-5 from the floor. As a junior, Jeter averaged 10.9 points and a team-high 6.6 rebounds per game. After considering graduate transferring and playing professionally, he decided to remain with Arizona as a fifth-year senior while pursuing a master's degree. Jeter missed the final two games of the conference season for an undisclosed violation of team rules. He averaged 6.5 points, 4.2 rebounds in 16.2 minutes per game. His play was hampered by several injuries during his senior season.

National team career
Jeter played for the United States at the 2014 FIBA Americas Under-18 Championship in Colorado Springs, Colorado. He joined the team as a replacement for Dwayne Morgan. Jeter averaged 6.6 points and 4.4 rebounds per game and won a gold medal.

Career statistics

College

|-
| style="text-align:left;"| 2015–16
| style="text-align:left;"| Duke
| 32 || 0 || 7.9 || .553 || – || .541 || 1.9 || .1 || .1 || .3 || 1.9
|-
| style="text-align:left;"| 2016–17
| style="text-align:left;"| Duke
| 16 || 6 || 14.9 || .500 || – || .556 || 2.7 || .4 || .4 || 1.1 || 2.6
|-
| style="text-align:left;"| 2017–18
| style="text-align:left;"| Arizona
| style="text-align:center;" colspan="11"|  Redshirt
|-
| style="text-align:left;"| 2018–19
| style="text-align:left;"| Arizona
| 30 || 26 || 24.8 || .574 || – || .623 || 6.6 || .6 || .5 || .6 || 10.9
|-
| style="text-align:left;"| 2019–20
| style="text-align:left;"| Arizona
| 22 || 16 || 16.2 || .564 || – || .607 || 4.2 || .6 || .3 || .4 || 6.5
|- class="sortbottom"
| style="text-align:center;" colspan="2"| Career
| 100 || 48 || 15.9 || .564 || – || .598 || 3.9 || .4 || .3 || .5 || 5.7

Personal life
Jeter's father, Chris, played college basketball for UNLV and was a reserve on its 1989–90 national championship team. Chris became a police officer for the Las Vegas Metropolitan Police Department.

References

External links
Arizona Wildcats bio
Duke Blue Devils bio
USA Basketball bio

1997 births
Living people
Centers (basketball)
American men's basketball players
Arizona Wildcats men's basketball players
Basketball players from Nevada
Duke Blue Devils men's basketball players
McDonald's High School All-Americans
Sportspeople from Las Vegas